Acutotyphlops solomonis is a species of snake in the family Typhlopidae. It is found in the Solomon Islands and Papua New Guinea.

References

Acutotyphlops
Endemic fauna of Papua New Guinea
Reptiles described in 1939